STCU, Spokane Teachers Credit Union, is a credit union chartered in the state of Washington and North Idaho. It is regulated under the authority of the National Credit Union Administration (NCUA) of the federal government. Membership is open to those "live, work, worship, or attend school" in Washington state, or counties in northern Idaho.

The credit union was founded in October 1934. STCU has more than 246,000 members and over $5 billion in assets. Among the many Washington-based credit unions, it is third-largest, based on asset size.

STCU was voted Best Bank/Credit Union each year from 2006-2010 and Best Credit Union from 2011-2022 in the "Best of the Inland Northwest" reader surveys conducted by The Inlander, a free weekly newspaper.

Services

STCU has 34 branch locations throughout Eastern and Central Washington and North Idaho. STCU reports that it began offering online banking in 1997, when many members were skeptical of the service. In 2010, the company updated its online banking system with features such as account alerts, secure messaging, and external transfers.

STCU is a member of the CO-OP Financial Services. Members pay no fees to use nearly 30,000 ATMs worldwide affiliated with the Co-Op Network of credit unions.

In 2015, STCU switched from Visa to Mastercard when the time came to implement EMV technology.

History
STCU was started in 1934 by Ernie McElvain, a teacher at Spokane's Lewis and Clark High School. The credit union operated out of a room on the school's second floor, with a shoebox for cash deposits and a bell with a rope that hung out the window, so that members could ring the bell when they needed to be let inside. The credit union ended the first year with 120 members and $4,000 in assets.

In 1964, STCU left the high school and opened its first office (now its Main Branch) at 106 W. Nora in Spokane. At the time, it had 2,078 members and $1.5 million in assets.

Leadership/Governance
In October 2017, STCU announced that CEO and President Tom Johnson would retire at the end of the year. Thomas A. Johnson was promoted to CEO and president, effective January 1, 2011. Johnson served 12 years on the STCU Board of Directors before becoming the credit union's vice president-administration in 2006.

Johnson has said that STCU's long-term planning is guided by three core values: growth in market share, customer service, and efficiency.

On January 1, 2018, Ezra Eckhardt began as the fifth CEO and President in STCU history. Eckhardt is a fifth generation Spokane resident. After Eckhardt attended U.S. Military Academy at West Point, he went on to serve six years in the U.S. Army. He holds a master's degree from Gonzaga University, where he has been an adjunct professor at the Jepson School of Business.

References

External links
Spokane Teachers Credit Union web site

Credit unions based in Washington (state)
Banks established in 1934
1934 establishments in Washington (state)
Companies based in Spokane County, Washington